Pyralis is a genus of snout moths. It was described by Carl Linnaeus in 1758.

Species
 Pyralis caustica (Meyrick, 1884)
 Pyralis costinotalis Hampson, 1917
 Pyralis electalis Hulst, 1886
 Pyralis farinalis (Linnaeus, 1758)
 Pyralis faviusalis Walker, 1859
 Pyralis haematinalis (Saalmüller, 1880)
 Pyralis joannisi Leraut, 2005
 Pyralis kacheticalis (Christoph, 1893)
 Pyralis laudatella Walker, 1863
 Pyralis lienigialis Zeller, 1843
 Pyralis manihotalis Guenée, 1854
 Pyralis palesalis Walker, 1859
 Pyralis perversalis Herrich-Schäffer, 1849
 Pyralis pictalis (J. Curtis, 1834)
 Pyralis regalis Denis & Schiffermüller, 1775
 Pyralis subjectalis Walker, 1866
 Pyralis transcaspica Rebel, 1903
 Pyralis trifascialis Moore, 1877

Former species
 Pyralis preciosalis Guillermet in Viette & Guillermet, 1996

References

Pyralini
Pyralidae genera